is a manga by Shohei Manabe. Although the original name was actually a transliteration from the English The End, Tokyopop changed the name to Dead End for the US market.

Story 
Shirou is a construction worker, tired of the usual daily routine of his job; he hopes that something will come to awake him from the monotony of his life, and his wish is answered when a young girl named Lucy, falling naked from the sky, enters his life. They spend together two days, enough for Shirou to fall in love with her; but on the third day, when Shirou comes back home, he can't find her anymore, and instead he finds his friends murdered. After that he meets a stranger who claims to be his friend, and learns that he had his memory voluntarily erased, he knew Lucy from before, and to find a way to solve the puzzle he has to find 5 old friends, who have had their memory erased just like him. Along with these five friends he must uncover, there are also many others who seek his death and one particular monster who kills in a brutal way.

References

External links 
 Official web page on Tokyopop's web site
 
 Mania.com vol. 1 review
 Mania.com vol. 3 review
 Ign UK Comics vol. 1 review

Kodansha manga
Seinen manga
Tokyopop titles